Elasmostethus atricornis is a species of shield bug in the family Acanthosomatidae. It is found in North America.

References

Acanthosomatidae
Articles created by Qbugbot
Insects described in 1904